Royal Wade Kimes (born March 3, 1951 in Chester, Arkansas) is an American country music singer.

Biography
Kimes worked at his father's sawmill until his father encouraged him to move to Nashville, Tennessee, which he did in 1983. He also worked at Loretta Lynn's dude ranch and later began recording demos through the encouragement of Eddy Arnold. Kimes also wrote the cut "We Bury the Hatchet" on Garth Brooks' album Ropin' the Wind, and signed with Asylum Records in 1996. The label released the single "Leave My Mama Alone", followed by his debut album Another Man's Sky. Stephen Thomas Erlewine gave the album three stars out of five, saying that it had "uneven material" but that Kimes's voice had "gravelly conviction".

Following it was the album's title track, which was made into a music video. The album's third single, "Guardian Angel", received a positive review in Billboard, which called it "country to the core" and praised Kimes as a "talented songwriter". After Kimes left Asylum, he began recording for Wonderment Records. Kimes charted at number 60 on the Hot Country Songs chart dated January 3, 2004 with "Mile High Honey".

Discography

Albums

Singles

Music videos

References

1951 births
American country singer-songwriters
American male singer-songwriters
Living people
Singer-songwriters from Arkansas
Asylum Records artists
People from Crawford County, Arkansas
Country musicians from Arkansas